Al-Zoubi, El-Zoubi, Al-Zubi, Zoubi, Zouabi, El-Zaabi, Zoabi or Zuabi is a prominent Levantine family whose members can be found throughout the Arab world, but are most concentrated in Northern Jordan, Southern Syria, and Palestine. The family is a Hasanite, Hashemite family that traces its lineage to the Hanbali Sunni Saint Abdul Qadir Al Gilani.

The epogenitor of the family name of Al-Zoubi is Ali Nour Al-Din Al Kilani, who was titled Al-Zoubi who lived in 16th century Ottoman Syria and Northern Jordan.

Lineage from Ali to Abdul Qadir 
Ali Nour Al-Din is a 16th generation descendent of Abdul Qadir Al Gilani through his son Abdul Aziz. Abdul Qadir's father, Musa III bin Abdullah, is a descendant of Muhammad's grandson Caliph Hasan, while Abdul Qadir's mother, Fatima Bint Abdullah Al Soma'ai Al-Husseini, is a descendent of the Muhammad from his grandson Hussein which makes him Ali Nour Al-Din a 29th generation descendent of The Prophet Muhammad through both Al-Hasan and Al-Hussein.

Ali's patrilineal lineage to Abdul Qadir is :

Ali Nour Al-Din Al-Zoubi bin Mohammad Shihab Al-Din bin Ya'qoub bin Abu Bakr bin Ali Nour Al-Din bin Zaid Al Abidin Mohammad bin Ahmad Abi Al Baqa' bin Mohammad Shams Al-Din bin Musa Sharaf Al-Din bin Mohammad Shams Al-Din bin Ali Nour Al-Din bin Al Hussein Iz' Al-Din bin Mohammad Al-Akhal bin Hussam Al-Din Sharsheeq bin Mohammad Al-Hattak bin Abdul Aziz bin Abdul Qadir Al Gilani.

Notable Members 
Notable members of the Al-Zoubi family include:
 H.E Mahmoud Al-Zoubi (1935–2000), Prime Minister of Syria from 1987 to 2000
H.E Ghaleb Al-Zoubi, Minister of interior in Jordan, 2017
 H.E Khaled Al-Zoubi, Minister of State for Parliamentary and Legal Affairs in Jordan, 1998
 H.E Muwaffaq Al-Zoubi, Minister of Tourism and Anqituities in Jordan, 1979
 H.E Abdullah Raja Al-Zoubi (born 1932), United Nations Interregional Advisor.
 H.E Akef Al-Zoubi, Minister of Agriculture in Jordan and currently acting Senator, 2005 and 2020
 H.E Hatim Al-Zoubi, Minister of Economy, Minister of Finance, Acting Minister of Foreign Affairs in Jordan, 1965-1969
 H.E Fawaz Hatim Al-Zoubi, Minister of Communications and Information Technology in Jordan, 2003
 H.E Sharif Ali Al-Zoubi, Minister of Industry and Trade in Jordan and Minister of Justice and Senator, 2005 and 2006
 Bashar al-Zoubi, Commander-in-Chief of the Free Syrian Army
 Walid Al Zoubi, Chairman of Tiger Group UAE, Philanthropist
 Amer Walid Al Zoubi, CEO of Tiger Group UAE
 Fadel El-Zoubi (born 1957), Jordanian, United Nations (FAO) Representative
 Abd el-Aziz el-Zoubi (1926–1974), Palestinian politician
 Abdel Rahman Zuabi (1932–2014), Palestinian judge
 Ahmad Hasan Al Zoubi (born 1975), Jordanian columnist, playwright and satirist
 Nadia Al-Zoubi (born 1983), Jordanian actress, influencer, and TV presenter.
 Omran al-Zoubi (born 1959), Syrian ministers of information
 Seif el-Din el-Zoubi (1913–1986), Palestinian politician
 Mohamed abdul Mawla Al-Zoubi (born 1940), chief editor of El Sayde news paper and international journalist
 Dr. Abdel Karim Al-Zoubi (1922–2009), Director of Health ministry, Deraa Province.

References 

Arabic-language surnames